Rudolph John Vecoli (1927–2008) was an American professor of immigration history who taught at the University of Minnesota.

Selected works 

 The People of New Jersey (1965)
 Italian Immigrants in Rural and Small Town America (1987, editor)
 A Century of European Migrations, 1830–1930 (1991, editor)

References

External links 

 Papers in the University of Minnesota Libraries

American historians